Sagil is a sum (district) of Uvs Province in western Mongolia.

The main road connecting Ulaangom to Khandagayty, Russia goes 5.5 km east from the center of the sum.

Populated places in Mongolia
Districts of Uvs Province